Raymond Gallois-Montbrun (15 August 1918, Saigon – 13 August 1994, Paris) was a French violinist and composer.

He studied violin and composition at the Conservatoire de Paris, and won the Prix de Rome in 1944.

His works include a violin concerto and the symphony Japan, as well as film scores, such as Danger de mort (1947) and Cry, the Beloved Country (1951).

References
Musimem biography, catalogue of works and memoir by Claude Pascal, accessed 3 February 2010

1918 births
1994 deaths
People from Ho Chi Minh City
20th-century classical composers
French male classical composers
Prix de Rome for composition
Conservatoire de Paris alumni
Directors of the Conservatoire de Paris
French opera composers
Members of the Académie des beaux-arts
Commandeurs of the Ordre des Arts et des Lettres
Grand Officers of the Ordre national du Mérite
20th-century French composers
20th-century French male musicians
French expatriates in Vietnam